Per Ragnar Dahlberg, (born 15 February 1943 in Stockholm) is a Swedish television presenter and producer who works for SVT in Norrköping. He has presented shows like Café Norrköping and Go'kväll during the 1980s and 1990s. In March 2007, he ended his career at the channel.

References

Living people
1943 births
Journalists from Stockholm
Sveriges Television
Swedish television hosts
Norrköping